Air Vice Marshal Rohan J Pathirage, USP, ndc, psc, CEng, MIE, SLAF was a Director  Electronics and Telecommunications Engineering of the Sri Lanka Air Force.

Educated at the prestiges Royal College Colombo, he gained his BSc and MSc in Engineering from the University of Moratuwa. Thereafter he joined the Sri Lanka Air Force as a direct entry officer in the Engineering Branch. After successful completion of basic training he was commissioned as a Flight Lieutenant through the direct entry stream. He is a Chartered engineer and corporate member of the Institution of Engineers, Sri Lanka.
 
Air Vice Marshal Pathirage has been awarded the service medals Uttama Seva Padakkama and Sri Lanka Armed Services Long Service Medal. He is a vice president of the Sri Lanka Volleyball Federation.

References

External links
Official Website of Sri Lanka Air Force

Sri Lanka Air Force air vice-marshals
Sinhalese military personnel
Sri Lankan military engineers
Alumni of Royal College, Colombo
Living people
Year of birth missing (living people)